Mississippi Petrified Forest is a petrified forest located near Flora, Mississippi in the United States. It is privately owned and open for public visits. The forest is believed to have been formed 36 million years ago when fir and maple logs washed down an ancient river channel to the current site where they later became petrified. It is one of only two petrified forests in the eastern United States, the other being Gilboa Fossil Forest in New York. It was declared a National Natural Landmark in October 1965.

The site features a museum with examples of petrified wood found in every state and from other countries. The samples include a variety of plant materials, including leaves, fruits, cones and bark. Other fossils and fossil casts are on display, including dinosaur footprints, whale bones and turtle shells.

References

External links
Official site

Fossil museums
Parks in Mississippi
Geography of Mississippi
National Natural Landmarks in Mississippi
Natural history museums in Mississippi
Dinosaur museums in the United States
Museums in Madison County, Mississippi
Forests of Mississippi
Protected areas of Madison County, Mississippi
Petrified forests
Paleontological protected areas in the United States
Fossil parks in the United States
Paleontology in Mississippi